Michael Viney MRIA (born 1933) is an artist, author, broadcaster, and journalist, based in Ireland. He was born in Brighton, England.  Best known for his writings on nature, he has contributed to The Irish Times since 1962.

Career
In the 1960s he wrote for The Irish Times about social issues such as the fate of people in institutional care. His articles were later incorporated into the Ryan Report on institutional abuse of children in Ireland.

He began working at RTÉ Television as presenter in programmes aimed at social, consumer affairs and with items on household and family matters. He took training there as a TV director and became a production editor in 1976. He left Dublin in 1977 with his wife, Ethna, and daughter for a simpler life in County Mayo in their Thallabawn holiday home on one acre.

Nature writing
Viney has published "Another Life", a weekly column in The Irish Times, since 1977 when he settled in rural Murrisk, near the coast south of Louisburgh.  Over the years the focus of the column has shifted from sustainability to natural history.

Honours
In 1966, Viney won a Jacob's Award for his RTÉ Television documentary, Too Many Children.

He is a member of Aosdána, an association of people who have achieved distinction in the arts.

He was elected to the Royal Irish Academy in May 2017.

Bibliography
Viney's books include:
 Ireland: A Smithsonian Natural History. 2003 
 Ireland's Ocean (co-written with Ethna Viney)

References

Irish columnists
Irish nature writers
Irish environmentalists
Jacob's Award winners
Aosdána members
Members of the Royal Irish Academy
Sustainability advocates
The Irish Times people
People from Brighton
People from County Mayo
Living people
1933 births